Robert Watts (born 23 May 1938) is a British retired film producer who is best known for his involvement with the Star Wars and Indiana Jones film series.

Career
Watts began working in the film industry in 1960, after two years' National Service. His first film work was as a runner on the Boulting brothers production A French Mistress. Watts earned his union membership during two years as a runner, and later production manager, at a company based at England's Shepperton Studios which made TV commercials and documentaries. He then returned to feature films as a second assistant director on the film Man in the Middle.

During the 1960s, Watts worked extensively as a production manager and location manager, including on Darling (1965) starring Julie Christie and Dirk Bogarde, the 1967 James Bond film You Only Live Twice and Kubrick's 2001: A Space Odyssey (1968).

Watts was employed by producer Gary Kurtz as production supervisor on Star Wars, having met Kurtz several years earlier in Los Angeles. Watts then enjoyed a long collaboration with George Lucas and Lucasfilm, working as associate producer on The Empire Strikes Back and co-producer on Return of the Jedi; and as associate producer on Raiders of the Lost Ark and producer on Indiana Jones and the Temple of Doom and Indiana Jones and the Last Crusade.  He also worked on other Steven Spielberg-presented productions including as producer on Who Framed Roger Rabbit and An American Tail: Fievel Goes West, and with Spielberg's long-term producer Frank Marshall on Marshall's second feature as director, Alive.

Personal life
Watts' half brother was Jeremy Bulloch, who played Boba Fett in the original Star Wars trilogy.

Filmography

References

External links

British film producers
Living people
1938 births